Witan Sulaeman (born 8 October 2001) is an Indonesian professional footballer who plays as a winger for Liga 1 club Persija Jakarta and the Indonesia national team.

A youth product of Ragunan Sports School, Witan started his professional career with PSIM Yogyakarta. He joined Serbian club Radnik Surdulica in July 2020, becoming the first Indonesian to play in a Serbian league. In 2021 he moved to Polish side Lechia Gdansk before being loaned to Slovakian side Senica in 2022. He moved to Trenčín  in the same year. The following year, Witan returned to Indonesia by joining Persija Jakarta.

Witan has represented Indonesia since U19 level. He has represented his side at two Southeast Asian Games and led his side to the final of the 2020 AFF Championship. Witan took part in Indonesia's qualification for the 2023 Asian Cup by scoring two goals.

Club career

PSIM Yogyakarta
On 17 August 2019, Witan signed his first professional contract at the age of 17 with Liga 2 side PSIM Yogyakarta. He made his first-team debut for PSIM Yogyakarta when he was part of the starting lineup of a 2019 Liga 2 match against Persiba Balikpapan on 22 August 2019, in which PSIM won.

Radnik Surdulica
At the age of 18, Witan joined Serbian SuperLiga club Radnik Surdulica in February 2020 on a three-and-a-half year deal. However, the season was soon suspended as a result of the COVID-19 pandemic for a period of  months, during which he returned to Indonesia. He finally made his professional debut on 14 June 2020, coming on for Bogdan Stamenković during a 4–2 SuperLiga defeat to Radnički Niš.

Lechia Gdańsk
On 1 September 2021, Witan joined Polish club Lechia Gdańsk on a two-year contract. Witan joined shortly after his international teammate Egy Maulana departured to Senica in Slovakia. Three days later, Witan made his Lechia Gdańsk debut in a friendly match against Jeziorak Iława as a substitute for Kacper Sezonienko in the 73rd minute.

He made his league debut for Lechia Gdańsk. However, he did not strengthen the main team, but for the reserve team, Lechia Gdańsk II. when he was part of the starting lineup of a IV liga match against MKS Wladyslawowo on 11 September, in which Lechia won.

On 26 July 2022, it is announced that Witan and Lechia Gdańsk both agreed to mutually terminate his contract.

FK Senica (loan)
On 21 January 2022, Witan joined Slovak Super Liga club Senica on loan until the end of the season. On 12 February 2022, Witan made his league debut playing full 90-minutes against league giants Slovan Bratislava, as his team suffered 0-5 defeat. Witan made his first goal for his club at Slovak Cup winning game against SV Sasona Arena. In the quarter final of Slovak Cup, against FK Pohronie, he gave one assist and one goal for the winning match.

Trenčín
On 9 August 2022, Slovak club AS Trenčín announced that they had signed Witan on a two-year contract. On 13 August 2022, Witan made his debut, coming on as a 73rd minute substitute for Lucas Demitra in a goal-less league draw against Ružomberok. On 24 August 2022, Witan scored his first and second goal for Trenčín during a record-setting 14–0 victory against Slovan Hlohovec in the Slovak Cup.

Persija Jakarta
On 31 January 2023, Witan joined Liga 1 side Persija on a three and a half year contract.

International career 
At the age of 16, Witan made his international debut with Indonesia U19 in the 2017 Toulon Tournament on 31 May 2017 against Brazil U20 with a score of 1–0 defeat. Later that year he scored a brace in an 8–0 win over Brunei at the 2017 AFF U-18 Youth Championship. He also scored in the third-place match against Myanmar.

At the 2018 AFC U-19 Championship held in Indonesia, Witan scored two goals in a group stage win over Chinese Taipei before scoring the lone goal in a 1–0 victory over the United Arab Emirates to lead his team to the quarterfinals for the first time in 40 years.

Witan was part of the Indonesia under-23 team that won silver in the 2019 Southeast Asian Games in the Philippines. He received a call to join the senior Indonesian national football team in May 2021. He earned his first senior cap in a 25 May 2021 friendly match in Dubai against Afghanistan. On 11 October 2021, he made first international goal against Chinese Taipei in a 2023 AFC Asian Cup qualification – Play-off Round leg 2, in which Indonesia won 3–0.

On 12 December 2021, Witan scored a goal in a 2020 AFF Championship game against Laos. On 22 December 2021, Witan scored again against Singapore in the first leg of semi-final.

On 14 June 2022, Witan scored a brace against Nepal in a 7–0 win in the  2023 AFC Asian Cup qualification.

Witan was again called up for the Indonesia senior team for the 2022 AFF Championship. He scored a goal against Cambodia at the group stage on 23 December 2022.

Personal life
In the midst of busy following the training camp with the Indonesian national team, On 29 May 2022, at the age of 20, Witan married his girlfriend, Rismahani. Witan officially married Rismahani in a wedding ceremony held in Palu, Central Sulawesi.

Career statistics

Club

International

International goals 
International under-23 goals

International senior goals

Honours 
Indonesia U-19
 AFF U-19 Youth Championship third place: 2017, 2018
Indonesia U-23
 AFF U-22 Youth Championship: 2019
 Southeast Asian Games  Silver medal: 2019
 Southeast Asian Games  Bronze medal: 2021

Indonesia
 AFF Championship runner-up: 2020

References

External links
 
 

2001 births
Living people
Indonesian footballers
Indonesia youth international footballers
Indonesia international footballers
Association football midfielders
PSIM Yogyakarta players
FK Radnik Surdulica players
Lechia Gdańsk players
Lechia Gdańsk II players
FK Senica players
AS Trenčín players
Persija Jakarta players
Liga 2 (Indonesia) players
Serbian SuperLiga players
Slovak Super Liga players
Indonesian expatriate footballers
Indonesian expatriate sportspeople in Serbia
Indonesian expatriate sportspeople in Poland
Indonesian expatriate sportspeople in Slovakia
Expatriate footballers in Serbia
Expatriate footballers in Poland
Expatriate footballers in Slovakia
People from Palu
Southeast Asian Games medalists in football
Southeast Asian Games silver medalists for Indonesia
Sportspeople from Central Sulawesi
Competitors at the 2019 Southeast Asian Games
Competitors at the 2021 Southeast Asian Games